Kol Koleh is a village in Mashayekh Rural District, Naghan District, Kiar County, Chaharmahal and Bakhtiari Province, Iran. At the 2006 census, its population was 330, in 67 families.

References 

Populated places in Kiar County